The Bornean pithecheirops  (Pithecheirops otion) is a species of rodent found in Borneo. It is monotypic in the genus Pithecheirops. Pithecheirops is closely related to the genus Pithecheir, and the name is derived from Pithecheir and the Greek ops, meaning  "resembling". The only known example of this species was caught in the Danum Valley Field Centre in Sabah, north Borneo, at approximately 150 m.

Description
It is similar to species in the genus Pithecheir, both having long, dense, soft fur and broad feet. The species is distinguished by the appearance of the inner ear bones and auditory bulla.

Habitat
It was found in "dense viny roadside secondary brush on an abandoned logging road". The dominant habitat of the area is lowland dipterocarp forest. IUCN lists the species as Data Deficient due to this being the only known example of the species. There is no information on population numbers or distribution to indicate if the species is at risk or not. However given the loss of forest and human disturbance in the area and the fact that it was found in a degraded habitat, it may be somewhat adaptable to habitat loss.

References

External links

Old World rats and mice
Taxa named by Louise H. Emmons